RTN may refer to: 
 Racetrack Television Network, North America
Random telegraph noise
 Recursive transition network
 Register transfer notation for synchronous digital circuits
 Reticular thalamic nucleus
 Retro Television Network, US
 Routing Transit Number in US banking system
 Royal Thai Navy
 Former callsign of the NRN TV station in Lismore, NSW, Australia
 RTN (Switzerland), radio broadcaster